Esteghlal Qazvin Football Club is an Iranian football club based in Qazvin, Iran. It competed in the 2009–10 Iran Football's 2nd Division.

Season-by-season
The table below shows the achievements of the club in various competitions.

 
Football clubs in Iran
Association football clubs established in 1998
1998 establishments in Iran